Events from the year 1680 in Ireland.

Incumbent
Monarch: Charles II

Events
April 29 – construction of the Royal Hospital Kilmainham in Dublin as a home for retired soldiers begins to the design of Sir William Robinson.
July 23–July 24 – trial of Oliver Plunkett, Roman Catholic Archbishop of Armagh and Primate of All Ireland, at Dundalk for conspiracy in the supposed "Popish Plot" ends without indictment and on 24 October he is transferred to London.
English antiquarian Thomas Dingley tours Ireland.
Edmund Borlase's The History of the execrable Irish Rebellion is published.

Arts and literature
The poem-book Leabhar Cloinne Aodha Buidhe'' is transcribed by Ruairí Ó hUiginn of Sligo at the command of Cormac Ó Neill.

Births
October 4 – Giles Alington, 4th Baron Alington (d.1691)

Full date unknown
Richard Cantillon, economic theorist (d.1734)
Bernard MacMahon, Roman Catholic Bishop of Clogher, later Archbishop of Armagh (d.1747)
Approximate date – Cathal Buí Mac Giolla Ghunna, poet (d.1756)

Deaths
July 30 – Thomas Butler, 6th Earl of Ossory, soldier and politician (b.1634)
August 23 – Thomas Blood, soldier, tried to steal the Crown Jewels of England from the Tower of London in 1671 (b.1618)
September or October – William Steele, Lord Chancellor of Ireland (b.1610)
c. November 15 – Peter Talbot, imprisoned Roman Catholic Archbishop of Dublin and Primate of Ireland (b.1620?)

References

 
1680s in Ireland
Ireland
Years of the 17th century in Ireland